U Television Sdn. Bhd. (formerly known as U Telecom Media Holdings Sdn. Bhd. and MiTV Corporation Sdn. Bhd.) is Malaysia's third pay television operator. It was launched on 5 September 2005, after having obtained all the necessary approvals from the censorship board on its broadcast contents. The company initially offered 40 channels from content providers worldwide.

History 
U television was officially launched on 5 September 2005 by Malaysian Prime Minister Abdullah Ahmad Badawi, at the Manhattan Ballroom in Berjaya Times Square Hotel & Convention Centre in Kuala Lumpur.

One of U television's distinguishing traits is that it utilises an internet protocol over UHF-based transmission system. Subscribers are required to install a standard UHF television antenna as opposed to a satellite dish to receive broadcasts. U television is therefore able to broadcast even during inclement weather.

U television is largely owned by Tan Sri Vincent Tan, the president of the Berjaya Group.

On 31 October 2006, the company announced a restructuring that included suspension of all marketing and new subscription activities. In addition, approximately 66% of the companies workforce was retrenched.

U television also owns a mobile phone operator called U Mobile.

See also 
 List of Malaysian television stations
 Mega TV (non-operational since 2001)
 Fine TV
 Astro
 U Mobile

References

External links 
 
 Updates on U Mobile
 U Mobile website
 TV3's Buletin Utama - MiTV Staff Retrenchment (in Malay)

Television in Malaysia
Mobile phone companies of Malaysia
Companies established in 2005
2005 establishments in Malaysia
Television channels and stations established in 2005
Pay television
Mass media in Kuala Lumpur
Privately held companies of Malaysia
Berjaya Corporation